More Beautiful for Having Been Broken is a 2019 American drama film directed by Nicole Conn and starring Zoe Ventoura, Kayla Radomski and Cale Ferrin. In the film, a broken female FBI agent, struggling with the loss of her mother, is suspended from her job and travels to the small mountain town in the countryside she used to visit as a child. She befriends a woman and her adorable, young, special needs son who possesses an extraordinary gift. The women's friendship soon turns into romance but family secrets complicate things.

Cast
Zoe Ventoura as Mackenzie De Ridder
Kayla Radomski as Samantha
Cale Ferrin as Freddie
Bruce Davison as Colin
Kay Lenz as Cassandra
Gabrielle Christian as Sasha Pinchot
Gabrielle Baba-Conn as Gabrielle Pinchot
Brooke Elliott as Kat
French Stewart as Rodney
Harley Jane Kozak as Vivienne Pinchot
Wally Kurth as Bud (Singer & Bartender)

Release
The film made its premiere at the Frameline Film Festival on June 30, 2019.

On March 24, 2020, it was announced that Vision Films acquired worldwide distribution rights to the film.

The film was released on DVD by Wolfe Video on April 7, 2020 and on digital platforms on May 8, 2020 in the United States and Canada.

Accolades
At the Los Angeles Independent Film Festival, the film won awards for Best Picture, Best Director, Best Actress (Ventoura) Best Actor (Ferrin) and Best Editing, and Best Original Score.

The film also won the Best Picture awards at the LA Femme Film Festival, the White Light City Film Festival and the International Ind Film Festival.

References

External links
 
 

American drama films
2019 LGBT-related films
2019 drama films
American LGBT-related films
Lesbian-related films
LGBT-related drama films
Films directed by Nicole Conn
Films scored by Nami Melumad
2010s English-language films
2010s American films